Loganton, officially the Borough of Loganton, is a borough in Clinton County, Pennsylvania, United States. The population was 469 at the 2020 census.

Geography
Loganton is located in southern Clinton County in the Sugar Valley, part of the Ridge-and-Valley Appalachians, and is situated at the northern base of Sugar Valley Mountain. Pennsylvania Route 477 passes through the center of Loganton and leads north through a water gap in Sugar Valley Mountain  to Exit 185 on Interstate 80. Pennsylvania Route 880 crosses PA 477 in the center of Loganton and runs the length of Sugar Valley, leading east  to Exit 192 on Interstate 80 and southwest  to Tylersville.

Demographics

As of the census of 2000, there were 435 people, 170 households, and 123 families residing in the borough. The population density was 411.7 people per square mile (158.4/km2). There were 176 housing units at an average density of 166.6 per square mile (64.1/km2). The racial makeup of the borough was 98.85% White, 0.23% African American, 0.69% Asian, and 0.23% from two or more races.

There were 170 households, out of which 29.4% had children under the age of 18 living with them, 62.4% were married couples living together, 7.6% had a female householder with no husband present, and 27.6% were non-families. 23.5% of all households were made up of individuals, and 14.1% had someone living alone who was 65 years of age or older. The average household size was 2.56 and the average family size was 2.98.

In the borough the population was spread out, with 23.0% under the age of 18, 6.4% from 18 to 24, 28.7% from 25 to 44, 24.8% from 45 to 64, and 17.0% who were 65 years of age or older. The median age was 40 years. For every 100 females there were 104.2 males. For every 100 females age 18 and over, there were 98.2 males.

The median income for a household in the borough was $38,250, and the median income for a family was $43,750. Males had a median income of $28,295 versus $19,688 for females. The per capita income for the borough was $16,773. About 3.6% of families and 4.4% of the population were below the poverty line, including 12.1% of those under age 18 and none of those age 65 or over.

References

External links
 Loganton Amish website

Populated places established in 1840
Boroughs in Clinton County, Pennsylvania
1864 establishments in Pennsylvania